This Means War is the third studio album by American metalcore band Attack Attack!. It was released on January 17, 2012 through Rise Records. Initially scheduled to be produced by John Feldmann (who previously produced tracks for the band's reissue of their self-titled album), production was instead handled by frontman Caleb Shomo in his home studio, making it the band's only album not to be produced by Joey Sturgis.

It is also the only album to feature Shomo on both singing and screamed vocals, after the departure of former singer/guitarist Johnny Franck. It was also the final album by the band before its disbandment in 2013, until the band reunited in October, 2020.

This Means War received generally mixed to fairly positive reviews from music critics, with some commending it as an improvement over the band's previous material, while others criticized its use of formula. It has since become the band's most commercially successful album to date, peaking at number 11 on the Billboard 200, selling more than 17,000 copies in its first week.

Background 
On November 14, 2011, it was announced that This Means War would be released on January 17, 2012. Along with this news they also posted dates for the "This Means War Tour" with supporting acts The Ghost Inside, Sleeping with Sirens, Chunk! No, Captain Chunk!, and Dream On, Dreamer.
On November 20, 2011, Attack Attack! filmed a music video for the song "The Wretched." On December 13, 2011, the first single titled "The Motivation" was streamed on YouTube and was released to buy on December 20, 2011.

Reception

This Means War received mixed reviews from music critics. At Metacritic, the album has a score of 60 out of 100, indicating "mixed or average reviews based on 6 critics". Gregory Heaney of Allmusic gave the album a 3.5/5 rating and said "Attack Attack! strip down their sound and focus on heaviness, making This Means War their hardest hitting and most coherent record to date" and continued "by not trying to force an evolution, Attack Attack! have managed to actually push their sound in a new and interesting direction". Alternative Press noted that "This Means War exhibits admirable growth, but if Attack Attack! radically purged themselves of all their pop predilections in favor of more savage riffage and chattering electronics, they’d set the bar so high, they’d be touring with the Dillinger Escape Plan and Converge’s Kurt Ballou would wear their shirts onstage." Allison Stewart of The Washington Post noted that "Ohio-based Attack Attack!’s main claim to fame is its alleged authorship of crabcore, in which band members squat-walk like crabs", and while the band members are "viewed as insufficiently ferocious scenesters by hard-rock purists", Attack Attack! "changed things up slightly on its latest outing, a pop-metal concept album that places most of its emphasis on metal." Stewart concluded that "Although Attack Attack! has never sounded tighter or smarter, this latest effort will never find an audience on the dance floor." Other reviews were much more negative. About.com gave the album a 2 out of 5 and stated that This Means War "is stale and predictable" and lacking imagination, and that while heavy metal music should change, "it shouldn’t sound like this." Sloane Daley of Punknews.org commented that while the album "is a step in the right direction for Attack Attack!", the "progress feels like it might be a band plateauing." Consequence of Sound webzine was severely critical, giving the album 1.5 out of 5 stars, saying that the album was a "deluge of whining that’s lyrically incomprehensible" that "becomes sonically dull after one song." Consequence of Sound continued on to say that the only sonic stamp to separate the band from similar metalcore acts are its electronic flourishes.

Commercial performance
This Means War has since become the band's highest charting album to date, debuting and peaking at number 11 on the Billboard 200 and selling more than 17,000 copies in its first week. It peaked at number 4 on the Rock Albums chart, number 4 on the Alternative chart, at 2 on Independent chart, and number 2 on the Hard Rock Albums charts.  On iTunes, it peaked at number 1 on the Rock charts and charted at number 8 overall. It also reached number 120 on the Canadian Albums Chart.

Track listing

Personnel 
Attack Attack!
 John Holgado – bass guitar, backing vocals 
 Caleb Shomo – lead vocals, keyboards, synthesizers, guitars
 Andrew Wetzel – drums
 Andrew Whiting – guitars

Production
Caleb Shomo - production, recording, mixing
Sean Mackowski - vocal engineering
Dave Shapiro - booking
Joey Simmrin - management
Megan Thompson - art direction, design, photography

Chart performance

References

2012 albums
Attack Attack! albums
Rise Records albums